The Embassy of Slovenia in London is the diplomatic mission of Slovenia in the United Kingdom. It was opened in 1992, one year after Slovenia declared independence from Yugoslavia. Previously on Little College Street, it later moved to Dartmouth Street.

References

External links
Official site

Slovenia
Diplomatic missions of Slovenia
Slovenia–United Kingdom relations
Grade II listed buildings in the City of Westminster